Nadia Fares Anliker (born 18 September 1962) is an Egyptian-Swiss film director and screenwriter.

Biography
Fares was born in Bern, Switzerland, the daughter of an Egyptian father and Swiss mother. She learned Arabic while studying in Cairo for a year, and graduated from Cairo University in 1986. The same year, Fares directed her first short film, Magic Binoculars, the first of several produced for Swiss television. Fares began attending New York University in 1987 to study film. In 1991, she won a prize from the Stanley Thomas Johnson Foundation for her short film Sugarblues. While at New York University, Fares was mentored by Krzysztof Kieślowski and served as the assistant director for several of his works. She took her master's degree in film studies in 1995.

In 1996, Fares directed her first feature-length film, Miel et Cendres. It follows the intersection of three women: doctor Naima, graduate Amina, and student Leila. Miel et Cendres traces their journeys as they navigate between tradition and modernity. It received 18 awards at several film festivals, including the Oumarou Ganda Prize at the Panafrican Film and Television Festival of Ouagadougou. Fares directed several brief documentary films on the topic of social-political issues for RTS/TV5 Monde.

Filmography
1986 : Magic Binoculars (short film)
1986 : Letters from New York (short film)
1987 : Projections on Sundays (short film)
1987 : Semi-Sweet (short film)
1988 : Charlotte's Empire (short film)
1988 : 1001 American Nights (short film)
1990 : Sugarblues (short film)
1992 : D'amour et d'eau fraîche (short film)
1993 : Made in Love (short film)
1995 : Portrait d'une femme séropositive (short film)
1995 : Lorsque mon heure viendra (short film)
1996 : Miel et Cendres 
2003 : Anomalies passagères (TV film)
2011 ; Expectations

References

External links
Nadia Fares at the Internet Movie Database

1962 births
Living people
Egyptian women film directors
Egyptian screenwriters
Cairo University alumni
New York University alumni
People from Bern